Steve Ryan is a retired American soccer player who played professionally in the North American Soccer League and American Soccer League.

Youth
Ryan graduated from Archbishop Riordan High School.  He then entered San Francisco State University where he played soccer during the 1975 season.  Ryan then transferred to San Jose State University, finishing his soccer career with them.  In 2010, SJSU awarded Ryan its Lifetime Achievement Award.  In 1979, he was captain of the U.S. soccer team at the 1979 World University Games.

Professional
In 1979, the San Jose Earthquakes of the North American Soccer League drafted Ryan.  He played two outdoor seasons with the Earthquakes and one indoor season (1979–1980) on loan to the Detroit Lightning of the Major Indoor Soccer League.  On May 22, 1981, the Earthquakes traded Ryan to the California Surf in exchange for Mark Lindsay.

References

External links
 NASL/MISL stats
 Ryan's coaching site

1956 births
Living people
American soccer players
California Surf players
Detroit Lightning players
San Jose Earthquakes (1974–1988) players
Major Indoor Soccer League (1978–1992) players
New Jersey Rockets (MISL) players
North American Soccer League (1968–1984) players
San Jose State Spartans men's soccer players
Soccer players from San Francisco
Association football midfielders
Association football forwards
San Francisco State Gators athletes